Liverpool Riverside was a railway station owned by the Mersey Docks and Harbour Board and located at Liverpool's Pier Head ocean liner terminal.

History
The station was specifically used for ship liner traffic, opening on 12 June 1895. It was accessed via the Victoria and Waterloo tunnels.

Beyond the buffers were waiting rooms and an inspector's office. It was rebuilt in 1945 after bomb damage. On the opposite side of Princes Parade from the station were the Customs examination rooms and the floating Princes Landing Stage, where the ships berthed.

Due to weight restrictions on the line, it was worked by a pair of LNWR Webb Coal Tank locomotives which took trains from Edge Hill railway station until strengthening of the infrastructure around the docks area in 1950 allowed large mainline locomotives to travel through. To open the line for a train the signalman had to walk about  fitting six Annett's keys into locks at the swing bridge and points. A pilot with a red flag walked a similar distance in front of each train that arrived and departed.

The station was closed when the Belfast Steamship Company's Ulster Queen hit the swing bridge at the entrance to Prince's Dock on 21 October 1949, reopening on 27 March 1950.

The station was heavily used during both World Wars, receiving troop trains from all over the United Kingdom and troops entering the country, however a decline in Atlantic liner traffic in the 1960s due to the growing popularity of air travel saw its use decline.

On 20 September 1960, English Electric type 4 locomotives D211 and D212 were respectively named Mauretania and Aureol at the station.

The last train to use the station was a troop train carrying soldiers bound for Belfast on 25 February 1971. It was demolished in the 1990s.

References

Further reading

Reed, C. Gateway to the West: A history of Riverside Station Liverpool, MD&HB – LNWR. LNWR Society, 1992.

External links

 Liverpool Riverside from Disused Stations
 Euston to New York via Liverpool 3,248 Miles — Steam powered all the way

Disused railway stations in Liverpool
Railway stations in Great Britain opened in 1895
Railway stations in Great Britain closed in 1971